Alice Tubello (born 30 January 2001) is a French tennis player.

Tubello has a career high WTA singles ranking of 361 achieved on 30 January 2023. She also has a career high WTA doubles ranking of 728 achieved on 30 January 2023.

Tubello won her first major ITF title at the 2023 Wiphold International in South Africa in the doubles draw partnering Mai Hontama.

Career titles

Singles (2–1)

Doubles (2)

References

External links

2001 births
Living people
French female tennis players